The 2017 season was the Minnesota Vikings' 57th in the National Football League, and their fourth under head coach Mike Zimmer. With the team's home stadium, U.S. Bank Stadium, scheduled to host Super Bowl LII at the end of the season, the Vikings attempted to make history as the first team to play the Super Bowl on their home field; in recording their best regular season record since 1998, they clinched a first-round bye for the first time since 2009 and became the eighth team in the Super Bowl era to qualify for the playoffs in a season in which their stadium hosted the Super Bowl. They defeated the New Orleans Saints in the Divisional Round 29–24 on a walk-off play referred to as the "Minneapolis Miracle", but lost 38–7 to the eventual Super Bowl champion Philadelphia Eagles in the NFC Championship Game.

This was the first season since 2006 without star running back Adrian Peterson on the roster, as the team declined his contract option in February.

Roster changes

Draft

Draft trades

Transactions

 Denotes this is a reserve/future contract.

Staff

Roster

Preseason

Schedule
The Vikings' preliminary preseason schedule was announced on April 10.

Game summaries

Week 1: at Buffalo Bills

Week 2: at Seattle Seahawks

Week 3: vs. San Francisco 49ers

Week 4: vs. Miami Dolphins

Regular season

Schedule

Note: Intra-division opponents are in bold text.

Game summaries

Week 1: vs. New Orleans Saints

Week 2: at Pittsburgh Steelers

Week 3: vs. Tampa Bay Buccaneers

Week 4: vs. Detroit Lions

Week 5: at Chicago Bears

Week 6: vs. Green Bay Packers

Week 7: vs. Baltimore Ravens

Week 8: at Cleveland Browns
NFL London Games

Week 10: at Washington Redskins

Week 11: vs. Los Angeles Rams

Week 12: at Detroit Lions
NFL on Thanksgiving Day

Week 13: at Atlanta Falcons

Week 14: at Carolina Panthers

Week 15: vs. Cincinnati Bengals

Week 16: at Green Bay Packers

Week 17: vs. Chicago Bears

Standings

Division

Conference

Postseason

Schedule

Game summaries

NFC Divisional Playoffs: vs. (4) New Orleans Saints

NFC Championship: at (1) Philadelphia Eagles

With their win against the Saints in the NFC Divisional Round, Minnesota became the first team in the Super Bowl era to advance to the conference championship game the same year they hosted the Super Bowl. Despite going to Lincoln Financial Field as three-point favorites, primarily due to a general lack of confidence in Eagles second-string quarterback Nick Foles, the Vikings lost in a massive upset to the number 1 seeded Philadelphia Eagles by a score of 38–7. Although the Vikings took an early lead on their opening drive via a pass from Case Keenum to Kyle Rudolph, the Eagles leveled the scores on a 50-yard Patrick Robinson interception return before scoring a further 31 unanswered points over the final three-quarters. This loss extended the Vikings' NFC title drought to 41 seasons, second only to the Detroit Lions' 48.

Pro Bowl
Four Vikings players were elected to the Pro Bowl when the rosters were announced on December 19, 2017, with three-time selection Everson Griffen, two-time selection Xavier Rhodes and first-timer Adam Thielen all named as starters, while Griffen's fellow third-timer Anthony Barr was named on the bench at outside linebacker behind the Cardinals' Chandler Jones and the Redskins' Ryan Kerrigan. Safety Harrison Smith was rated as the best safety in the league by Pro Football Focus over the course of the season, but was not included in the roster for the Pro Bowl, leading to some considering him to be one of the biggest snubs of the season.

Smith was eventually named to the NFC's Pro Bowl roster on January 22, after New York Giants safety Landon Collins withdrew due to injury. Kyle Rudolph was also included after Jimmy Graham pulled out with an injury, while Linval Joseph took the place of the Super Bowl-bound Philadelphia Eagles' Fletcher Cox. Smith will be appearing in his third straight Pro Bowl, while Rudolph and Joseph are appearing in their second career Pro Bowls. Barr and Griffen also pulled out of the Pro Bowl due to injury, replaced by Thomas Davis and Michael Bennett respectively.

Statistics

Team leaders

Source: Minnesota Vikings' official website

League rankings

Source: NFL.com

References

External links

Minnesota Vikings
2017
Minnesota Vikings
NFC North championship seasons